Słowik may refer to:

Słowik, Łódź Voivodeship (central Poland)
Słowik, Będzin County in Silesian Voivodeship (south Poland)
Słowik, Świętokrzyskie Voivodeship (south-central Poland)
Słowik, Częstochowa County in Silesian Voivodeship (south Poland)

See also
Slowik (surname)